Trevor James is an English football manager who is the currently head coach of USL Championship club Detroit City FC.

Career

James started his managerial career as assistant manager of American top flight side LA Galaxy. In 2010, he was appointed assistant manager of Portland Timbers in the United States. In 2017, James was appointed assistant manager of American second tier club Indy Eleven. In 2019, he was appointed manager of Detroit City FC in the American fourth tier, helping them win three regional titles and earn placement to the American third tier. After 2 titles in the third tier National Independent Soccer Association, Detroit City moved to the second tier USL Championship. James led the team to a playoff appearance in their first USL Championship season, and a victory over MLS club Columbus Crew in the 2022 U.S. Open Cup.

References

External links
 

English expatriate football managers
English expatriate sportspeople in the United States
English football managers
Expatriate soccer managers in the United States
Living people
National Independent Soccer Association coaches
National Premier Soccer League coaches
USL Championship coaches
Year of birth missing (living people)
Sportspeople from Norwich
LA Galaxy non-playing staff
Portland Timbers non-playing staff
Chicago Fire FC non-playing staff
Indy Eleven coaches